Mohamed Kajole was a Tanzania footballer who played for Tanzania in the 1980 African Cup of Nations.

References

External links

11v11 Profile

Tanzanian footballers
Tanzania international footballers
1980 African Cup of Nations players
Association footballers not categorized by position
Year of birth missing